Kangalin Vaarthaigal is a 1998 Indian Tamil-language drama film directed by Muktha S. Sundar. It stars Vikram, newcomer Sriram, Prema and Karan. Music by Ilayaraja. The film was a remake of 1996, Kannada film Nammoora Mandara Hoove.

Cast
Vikram as Chandru
Sriram as Madhan
Prema as Janaki
Jeeva as Kausalya
Karan as Chandru's uncle
R. Sundarrajan
Kunnakudi Vaidyanathan
Kaka Radhakrishnan
Loose Mohan
Pandu
Jagan
Rukmini

Production
The film marked Muktha Srinivasan's 50th year in the film industry. Though Vikram's big budget film, Ullaasam (1997), became a box office failure - the producers still offered him the chance to star in a new project, although they felt that he could not carry a film on his own. Newcomer Sriram, who was a medical student, was subsequently added to the cast.

Soundtrack
Music was composed by Ilaiyaraaja. All the songs from the Kannada film were retained, which had also been composed by the Ilaiyaraaja.

Release
A critic wrote "eventhough the basic plot is the same old love triangle, the scenes in the movie feels fresh". A reviewer from The Hindu wrote "the concluding portions where the three meet in a clash of emotions, the boys being beaten by a level- headed girl, requires some more depth in handling."

References

1998 films
Films scored by Ilaiyaraaja
Tamil remakes of Kannada films
1990s Tamil-language films